Lillian Riemer BeVier (born June 11, 1939) is a professor of law at the University of Virginia School of Law.  She was the first woman to become a full professor at the law school, and she holds the position of Distinguished Professor of Law Emeritus.

Early life and education 

BeVier earned a bachelor's degree from Smith College in 1961 and a law degree from Stanford Law School in 1965.

Early career 

BeVier began her career working on staff at Stanford University, and she also worked as a research associate for a Stanford Law School professor.  She later practiced law at a firm in Palo Alto, California and worked as an assistant professor at Santa Clara University School of Law.

Professorial career 

BeVier joined the University of Virginia law faculty in 1973. She has taught constitutional law (with special emphasis on First Amendment issues), intellectual property (trademark, copyright), real property, and torts. She was the first woman to become a full professor at the Law School. In May 2010, BeVier retired after 40 years as a law professor, 37 of which were spent at the University of Virginia.

Failed nomination to the Fourth Circuit 

On October 22, 1991, President George Herbert Walker Bush nominated BeVier to the U.S. Court of Appeals for the Fourth Circuit.  However, her nomination was never processed by the Democrat-controlled U.S. Senate Judiciary Committee, and was returned to Bush at the end of his presidency.

Possible nomination to the U.S. Supreme Court 

BeVier was mentioned as a potential replacement for Supreme Court Justice Sandra Day O'Connor. President George W. Bush ultimately selected Samuel Alito.

See also

George H.W. Bush judicial appointment controversies

References 

1939 births
Living people
First Amendment scholars
American legal scholars
People from Virginia
University of Virginia School of Law faculty
Smith College alumni
Stanford Law School alumni
Place of birth missing (living people)
Santa Clara University School of Law faculty